The Washington Street station is an underground station on the Newark City Subway Line of the Newark Light Rail. The station is owned and service is operated by New Jersey Transit. The station is located at the intersection of Raymond Boulevard and Washington Street with a second entrance at University Avenue, both in Downtown Newark. The station serves the western edge of downtown and the University Heights neighborhood. The station was opened in 1935. The station is decorated with beige tiles and colored tiles for borders, mosaics and street indicator signs. Some mosaic street indicators still show the exit for "Plane Street" which is the previous name for University Avenue. This station is wheelchair accessible.

History
In 1910, the Public Service Corporation planned to build two subway lines meeting at Broad Street (now Military Park). In 1929 construction began on the east-west subway line (#7), now the Newark Light Rail, which was built in the old Morris Canal bed with Raymond Boulevard built over it, and service started on the line on May 26, 1935.

Attractions
Essex County Courthouse
Essex County College
Rutgers–Newark
Institute of Jazz Studies
restaurants and galleries

References

External links

 Washington Street entrance from Google Maps Street View

Newark Light Rail stations
Railway stations in the United States opened in 1935
1935 establishments in New Jersey
Railway stations located underground in New Jersey